Tokyo Sun Shower is a 2008 South Korean television series starring Kim Sa-rang and Kim Tae-woo. This drama is a joint Korea-Japan production.

Plot
A young actress, Soo-jin, runs away while filming a commercial shoot in Tokyo. She meets and falls in love with Hyun-soo, a sushi chef from Korea living in Japan. Seven years later and now a famous actress, she still cannot forget him.

Cast
Kim Sa-rang as Lee Soo-jin
Kim Tae-woo as Jung Hyun-soo 
Jin Goo as Park Sang-gil
Ivy as Eun-bi 
Erika Okuda as Megumi
Lee Ki-young as Chun Man-hee
Ryohei Otani as Yuseuke

Episode ratings

Source: TNS Media Korea

References

External links
Tokyo Sun Shower official SBS website 

Seoul Broadcasting System television dramas
South Korean romance television series
Korean-language television shows
2008 South Korean television series debuts
2008 South Korean television series endings